Mahmudul Hasan (born 22 October  1994) is a Bangladeshi cricketer. He made his List A debut for Victoria Sporting Club in the 2016–17 Dhaka Premier Division Cricket League on 8 June 2017.

References

External links
 

1994 births
Living people
Bangladeshi cricketers
Victoria Sporting Club cricketers
Place of birth missing (living people)